Physical year  may refer to:

Fiscal year, used for calculating annual financial reports in businesses
International Geophysical Year, an international scientific effort in 1957-1958
International Heliophysical year, an international scientific effort in 2007-2008